Markowizna may refer to the following places:
Markowizna, Łódź Voivodeship (central Poland)
Markowizna, Silesian Voivodeship (south Poland)
Markowizna, Subcarpathian Voivodeship (south-east Poland)